The Wee Georgie Wood Railway is a  narrow gauge tourist tramway running from Tullah, on a  short track by the edge of Lake Rosebery in the West Coast Municipality of Tasmania.

Location 
It is close to the Pieman River hydro-electric scheme, Lake Rosebery, Lake Mackintosh, and Lake Murchison. Some sections of the old track have been flooded, after the hydro-electric dams had been built. East of the Murchison Highway, the remaining 600m of railway to the mines was repurposed into part of the Mackintosh Dam Road.

Name 
The original name varied between being known as the North Mount Farrell Tramway, Farrell Tramway or Tullah Tram.

History 

Galena, the most important lead ore mineral and a frequent source of silver, was discovered in the district of Tullah in 1892. Getting the ore to market was very difficult: The North Mount Farrell mine first shipped out ore by pack horse in 1899, because there was no road or track to Tullah, until the Murchison Highway was opened in 1962.

Originally planned to be laid with iron rails, it was eventually opened as a horse tram in 1902 with timber rails. The tramway could handle the transportation of the ore at reasonable cost, but as output from the mine increased, was unable to handle the traffic. A shorter route to the railway was surveyed, running on the north side of the Pieman River. The steel-railed steam tramway line was constructed by Dunkley Brothers, who were well known in Tasmania for their activities in the timber industry and was taken in service in 1909. It met the Emu Bay Railway at Farrell Siding, which was located on a continuous 1:40 grade as that railway dropped down to the Pieman River bridge. Therefore, complicated transhipment facilities needed to be erected.

The mine closed in 1932 due to the raw metal price drop during the worldwide economic crisis, but it re-opened in 1934, when a new presence of galena was found not far away. Immediately after the Murchison Highway was officially opened in 1962 the tramline between Tullah and Farrell Siding was not used anymore, but the steam locomotive Wee Georgie Wood was still used until late 1964 for the  section between the mine and the flotation plant.

In 1977 the Wee Georgie Wood Steam Railway Inc was formed with the objective of overhauling Wee Georgie to working condition and later to use it for hauling tourist trains. Volunteers and generous local and coastal businesses put Wee Georgie was back in steam, rebuilt  of narrow gauge track and restored a passenger carriage, which had previously been used on the Lake Margaret Tramway. On 5 February 1987, The Hon. Premier of Tasmania Robin Gray officially opened Wee Georgie Wood Steam Railway Inc. to the public.

In the centenary of the railway in 2002, celebrations and publications increased knowledge of the locomotives and their history.

Locomotives
The railway originally had 3 locomotives, Wee Georgie Wood, Wee Mary and a Krauss engine named Puppy. Wee Mary was never restored and its chassis is currently in the Ida Bay/Lune River area. Prior to working in Tullah, Puppy worked in the Duck River region of the state and was eventually bought by the North Mt Farrell Co. The name "Puppy" was given due to its high pitched whistle, but it was originally Krauss number 2640 of 1892. The engine was eventually sold to Ida Bay in the 1930s where it still is today. The best known locomotive, Wee Georgie Wood, has been salvaged and returned to operation, but as of 2010, it has been stripped down due to restoration work while the diesel engine "Alpha Romeo" works the short track in its place. The Wee Georgie Wood railway currently has the remains of another Krauss locomotive that worked in the Queenstown area, a few electric locomotives and a gang motor from the original line.

From the centenary booklet of 2002:

See also
Railways on the West Coast of Tasmania

References

Sources

Further reading

External links
 
 Wee Georgie Wood Railway Preservation in Tasmania via archive.org

History of Tasmania
2 ft gauge railways in Australia
Heritage railways in Australia
Railway lines opened in 1902
Railway lines in Western Tasmania
Pieman River Power Development
Tourist railways in Tasmania